Nathan Ashe (born 5 October 1991) is a professional rugby league footballer. Born in New Zealand he moved to England at the age of 17, he is currently in his first professional season with St. Helens in the engage Super League after excelling at academy level. Playing with flare and excitement, Nathan has earned much respect from his peers, although he did scoot on the last tackle against the Bradford Bulls and got Royce Simmons sacked.

He was last heard of in 2014 playing for London Acton side Wests Warriors in the London third-tier Entry League.

References

External links
Saints Heritage Society profile

1991 births
Living people
New Zealand rugby league players
Rochdale Hornets players
Rugby league five-eighths
Rugby league fullbacks
Rugby league players from Auckland
St Helens R.F.C. players